Joseph Fisher (August 24, 1843 – October 8, 1903) was an American soldier who fought in the American Civil War. Fisher received the country's highest award for bravery during combat, the Medal of Honor, for his action during the Third Battle of Petersburg in Virginia on 2 April 1865. He was honored with the award on 16 January 1894.

Biography
Fisher was born in Philadelphia, Pennsylvania on 24 August 1843. He first enlisted into a three-month service with the 23rd Pennsylvania Volunteer Infantry in April 1861. After mustering out he reentered the service in September 1861, joining the 61st Pennsylvania Infantry. He went on to be promoted to corporal and, on 2 April 1865, performed the act of gallantry that earned him the Medal of Honor.

Fisher died on 8 October 1903 and his remains are interred at the Fernwood Cemetery in Lansdowne, Pennsylvania.

Medal of Honor citation

See also

List of American Civil War Medal of Honor recipients: A–F

References

1843 births
1903 deaths
People of Pennsylvania in the American Civil War
Union Army officers
United States Army Medal of Honor recipients
American Civil War recipients of the Medal of Honor
Burials at Fernwood Cemetery (Lansdowne, Pennsylvania)
Military personnel from Philadelphia